Ali Zulfikar Pasha ( (d. 27 July 1904, Evian-les-Bains) was twice Foreign Minister of Egypt. He was a major landholder in Egypt.

Career 
Ali was a slave brought from Greece.He was born in Mesolongi of the Greek prefecture of Etoloakarnania in 1814. His Greek name was Panos (Panagiotis) Galanos. He was captured as a slave on April 11, 1826, during the Siege of Mesolongi.  He given by Muhammad Ali Pasha to his son (and future Wali of Egypt) Sa'id of Egypt as a study companion. He served in the Egyptian navy from 1834, and was appointed president of the Majlis al-Ahkam in 1857. He was made governor of Alexandria in 1866. Ali was director of the Justice Ministry in the government of Muhammad Sharif Pasha. After serving as foreign minister from 1888 to 1891, his last post was chief of protocol. Years later, Ali Zulfikar Pasha reunited with his family, his mother and his brothers Asimakis and Spyros, whom he dismissed in public service and all lived together in Egypt. Ali Zulfikar Pasha, despite being forced to convert to Islam from an early age, remained a crypto-Christian all his life. His son was Said Zulfiqar Pasha. https://www.inewsgr.com/0/zulfiqar-pacha-o-ellinas-pasas-apo-to-mesolongi-me-to-epitheto-galanos.htm.

References 

Foreign ministers of Egypt
19th-century Egyptian people
1814 births
1892 deaths